Architecture Label is an independent record label based in Sydney, Australia. It is managed by Stefan Zagorski and is the Australian label for Death Cab for Cutie.

Artists with releases on Architecture 
 Belles Will Ring
 Bit By Bats
 Death Cab for Cutie
 Pedro the Lion
 School of Emotional Engineering
 So Many Dynamos
 Sounds Like Sunset
 Spod

See also 
 List of record labels

References

External links
 

Architecture Label
Indie rock record labels
Alternative rock record labels
Record labels established in 2003